Operation Solace was the Australian Defence Force's main contribution to the Unified Task Force (UNITAF) which was a United States led, United Nations sanctioned, multinational force which operated in the Republic of Somalia from 9 December 1992 to 4 May 1993. Codenamed Operation Restore Hope, UNITAF was charged with carrying out United Nations Security Council Resolution 794: to create a protected environment for conducting humanitarian operations in the southern half of the Republic of Somalia.

Operation Solace centred on the deployment of the 1st Battalion, Royal Australian Regiment (1RAR) battalion group to Baidoa in south-central Somalia. The 1 RAR battalion group replaced the 3rd Battalion, 9th United States Marine Regiment in Baidoa on 19 January 1993. The Battalion group was successful in improving the security situation and earned the respect of the non-government aid organisations operating in the region. The 1 RAR battalion group left Somalia on 21 May 1993.

The main Australian units deployed to Somalia during Operation Solace were:
 1st Battalion, Royal Australian Regiment battalion group
 HMAS Tobruk
 HMAS Jervis Bay

References
 www.anzacday.org.au Somalia 1993–1996
 John Hunter Farrell Somalia: The 1RAR Group Tour of the Bay Region 1993, in Australia and New Zealand Defender.

Further reading

Solace